Animal is an American nature documentary series made for Netflix. The series is narrated by Anthony Mackie and features Bryan Cranston, Rebel Wilson, Rashida Jones, and Pedro Pascal. It follows the world's most magnificent creatures, capturing never-before-seen moments, both heartwarming and extreme. The series was released on Netflix on November 10, 2021.

Episodes

Season 1 (2021)

Season 2 (2022)

References

External links 
 

2021 American television seasons
2021 American television series debuts
English-language Netflix original programming
Netflix original documentary television series
Documentary films about nature
Television series about mammals